The following is a list of songs written about Kolkata or Calcutta, the capital city of West Bengal province of India:

"Hymn for Kolkata" – by The Geek's Guitar
"Ami Miss Calcutta" – sung by Aarti Mukherjee in Basanta Bilap (1972) film
"Kolkata" – sung by Nachiketa Chakraborty in Ei Besh Bhalo Achhi (1993) album
"Ami Kolkatar Rosogolla" – sung by Kavita Krishnamurthy
"Na Champa Na Chameli" – sung by Mamta Sharma in Bikram Singha: The Lion Is Back (2012) film, mentions "Kolkata"
"Kolkatar Rosogolla" – sung by Kavita Krishnamurthy in Cockpit (2017) film
"Kolkata Kolkata" – sung by Usha Uthup
"Amar Shohor" – sung by Shreya Ghoshal in Uro Chithi (2011) film
"Kolkata" – sung by Anupam Roy and Shreya Ghoshal in Praktan (2016) film
"O Kolkata" – sung by Shreya Ghoshal in Uraan (2020) film
"Amar Shohor Kolkata" – a song from Kolkata Special film.
"Calcutta", a German song sung by Lawrence Welk
"Amar Shohor" by Chandrabindoo sung by Anindya Chatterjee
"Yamaha Nagari " by Mani Sharma in Telugu movie Choodalani Vundi sung by Hariharan.

References

Kolkata
Culture of Kolkata
Songs about India
Songs